Ahmed Ezrie Shafizie bin Sazali (born 24 February 1986) is a Malaysian footballer who plays as a central midfielder. Ezrie has also played for several clubs such Johor Darul Ta'zim, Johor and Kelantan.

He made his debut for the Malaysia national team in a friendly against Indonesia on 14 September 2014.

Career statistics

Club

Honours

Club
Johor Darul Ta'zim
Malaysia FA Cup: Runners-up 2013

PDRM
Malaysia Premier League: 2014

Melaka United
Malaysia Premier League: 2016

References

External links 
 

1986 births
Living people
Malaysian footballers
Malaysia international footballers
Kelantan FA players
People from Kota Bharu
People from Kelantan
Johor Darul Ta'zim F.C. players
Malaysia Super League players
Association football midfielders
Melaka United F.C. players
Malaysian people of Malay descent